Nigel Peter Smith (born 21 December 1969) is an English former professional footballer who played as a winger.

References

External links

1969 births
Living people
Footballers from Leeds
English footballers
Association football midfielders
Leeds United F.C. players
Burnley F.C. players
Bury F.C. players
Shrewsbury Town F.C. players
English Football League players